Phyllonorycter hilarella is a moth of the family Gracillariidae. It is found in all of Europe, except the Balkan Peninsula and the Mediterranean Islands.

The wingspan is .The head is whitish, mixed with fuscous, face white. Antennae with apex white. Forewings are golden-ochreous; a white median streak from base to 1/3 an ill-defined white dorsal spot at 1/4; a slightly bent median fascia, three posterior costal and two dorsal spots white, anteriorly dark-margined; a black apical dot; dark line of cilia nearly obsolete. Hindwings are grey.
 
There are two generations per year with adults on wing in late May and June and again in August.

The larvae feed on Salix aurita, Salix caprea and Salix cinerea. They mine the leaves of their host plant. They create a large, lower-surface tentiform mine, mostly between two side veins. The upperside is strongly inflated and the underside has many narrow folds. The pupa is light brown and made in a golden cocoon. The frass is deposited in a corner of the mine.

References

External links
 

hilarella
Moths described in 1839
Moths of Europe
Taxa named by Johan Wilhelm Zetterstedt